WJIM (1240 kHz) is a commercial AM radio station licensed to Lansing, Michigan.  It is owned by Townsquare Media and broadcasts a talk radio format.  It is also the flagship station of the Michigan Talk Network.  Studios and offices are on Pinetree Road in Lansing.

WJIM is a Class C station, powered at 890 watts non-directional.  Programming is simulcast on FM translator W295BP at 106.9 MHz.

Programming
Weekdays begin with "The Steve Gruber Show," heard on WJIM since March 2012 and also airing on other stations around the state via the Michigan Talk Network.  Late mornings feature "Michigan's Big Show starring Michael Patrick Shiels".  The rest of the schedule is made up of nationally syndicated talk shows, include Dave Ramsey, Todd Schnitt, Joe Pags, "Markley, Van Camp & Robbins," "Our American Stories with Lee Habeeb" and "Red Eye Radio."

Weekends feature shows on money, health, religion, cars, travel and the outdoors.  WJIM is a network affiliate of ABC News Radio.  WJIM is the Lansing outlet for Michigan State University's Spartan Sports Network, airing all MSU football and basketball games. It is not, however, the flagship station.  That role belongs to WJR in Detroit.

History
On August 22, 1934, WJIM began broadcasting on 1210 kHz with 250 watts daytime and 100 watts at night.  It was owned by Harold Gross and his company, Capital Broadcasting.  According to local legend, Gross won the license, the oldest continually operated commercial license in Lansing, in a card game.  He named the station after his son Jim, who would become the station's general manager from the 1960s through the sale of the station in 1985 to Liggett Communications. Lansing's first radio station, WHW, folded in 1923.  In 1941 WJIM moved to 1240 kHz with 250 watts as a part of the North American Regional Broadcasting Agreement.

Also in 1941, WJIM was issued a Construction Permit for a commercial FM station with the call sign W77XL in July of this year. However, the station was never completed and the FCC deleted it a little over a year later in September 1942.

One of WJIM's hallmarks for most of its existence was extensive news coverage. It spawned Lansing's first television station, WJIM-TV (channel 6, now WLNS-TV) in 1950.  The two stations combined forces to cover Central Michigan news.  In recent years following the sale to Cumulus and then Townsquare, the station's news department was eliminated. The station now only airs syndicated state and national newscasts, leaving competitor 1320 WILS the only remaining radio station in the market covering local news.

In 1960, WJIM added an FM station, 97.5 WJIM-FM.  After initially simulcasting programming from AM 1240, WJIM-FM switched to beautiful music and is today a Top 40 station.

From the 1950s through the 80s, WJIM had a full service middle of the road format and was an NBC Radio News affiliate.  But as music listening shifted to FM radio in the 1980s, WJIM added more talk shows, including NBC Talknet.  In the 1990s, it made the transition to all talk programming.

On August 30, 2013, a deal was announced in which Townsquare would acquire 53 Cumulus stations, including WJIM, for $238 million. The deal was part of Cumulus' acquisition of Dial Global; Townsquare and Dial Global were both controlled by Oaktree Capital Management. The sale to Townsquare was completed on November 14, 2013.

References

External links

Michiguide.com - WJIM History
Broadcasting Yearbook 1938 and 1943
FCC History Cards for WJIM

JIM (AM)
News and talk radio stations in the United States
Townsquare Media radio stations
Radio stations established in 1934
1934 establishments in Michigan